Solar power in Alabama on rooftops could theoretically provide 29.8% of all electricity used in Alabama, with 20,400 MW of solar panels potentially installed on rooftops.

Alabama was ranked 50th among US states for solar power in 2020, and 35th in Q1 of 2021, with .027% of the state's power generated by solar.

Net metering
Offering net metering is required by federal law, but Alabama is one of only four states to not have adopted a statewide policy on net metering, which means it needs to be negotiated with the utility. IREC best practices, based on experience, recommends no limits to net metering, individual or aggregate, and perpetual roll over of kWh credits.

Alabama Power has installed four types of solar panels in Birmingham that can be monitored on the Internet. The company will pay up to 4.81¢/kWh during the summer and 3.93¢/kWh in the winter for excess generation from up to 100 kW systems. Peak power rates are weekdays, 1 to 7 pm in summer and 5 to 9 am in winter. Customers choosing the Time Advantage Energy rate pay 7¢/kWh during winter peak periods and 25¢/kWh during summer peak periods. Off peak is charged 5¢/kWh. Using time advantage requires a time of use meter, and the base charge is increased by $10.50 each month.

Solar power projects
In 2010, one of Alabama's largest solar arrays was the 25 kW system installed at the Coastal Response Center, in Coden, Alabama. A $250,000 economic stimulus grant was used to install 156 solar panels on Anniston's Museum of Natural History, which was completed on August 24, 2011. The output of this 25.2 kW system can also be monitored online.

River Bend Solar, completed in 2016, contributes 75 MW capacity to the TVA power grid, and reduces carbon emissions by 100,000 tons annually.

LaFayette Solar Farm in LaFayette, completed in 2019, supplies 79.2 MW to Walmart.

In 2021, Covington Electric Cooperative, which is constructing a 100 kW solar array, is the only rural electric cooperative in Alabama with a community solar program.

Solar panel manufacturing 
In 2019, LG Electronics opened a solar panel manufacturing plant in Huntsville.

Statistics

See also

Solar power in the United States
Renewable energy in the United States

References

External links
Incentives and policies
Alabama Power
Alabama Solar Association

Alabama
Energy in Alabama